Juan Darío Batalla (born September 18, 1979) is an Argentine footballer who played domestically for Vélez Sársfield (1996–1998), Sarmiento de Junín (1999–2000), Atlético Rafaela (2000–2001), Excursionistas (2001–2002), Deportivo Merlo (2003), Talleres (RE) (2004), Defensores de Belgrano (2004–2005), Huracán de Tres Arroyos (2005–2006), Huracán de Comodoro Rivadavia (2008–2009) and San Telmo (2009–2011), for Chilean club San Marcos de Arica (2002), for Spanish club Compostela (2006–2007), and in Indonesia for PSS Sleman (2007–2008) and Real Mataram of the Liga Premier (2011–2012).

References
 Profile at BDFA 
 Profile at Fútbol XXI  

1979 births
Living people
Argentine footballers
Association football midfielders
Club Atlético Vélez Sarsfield footballers
Huracán de Comodoro Rivadavia footballers
Huracán de Tres Arroyos footballers
Defensores de Belgrano footballers
Atlético de Rafaela footballers
Club Atlético Sarmiento footballers
Deportivo Merlo footballers
San Telmo footballers
San Marcos de Arica footballers
Primera B de Chile players
Argentine Primera División players
Argentine expatriate footballers
Argentine expatriate sportspeople in Spain
Expatriate footballers in Chile
Expatriate footballers in Spain
Expatriate footballers in Indonesia
People from San Isidro, Buenos Aires
Sportspeople from Buenos Aires Province